Hubbard Park may refer to:

Hubbard Park (Meriden, Connecticut), which extends into adjacent town Southington, and is listed on the NRHP in Connecticut
Hubbard Park of Cambridge, Massachusetts, included in Hubbard Park Historic District
Hubbard Park (Montpelier, Vermont), where Montpelier High School cross-country team practices
Hubbard Park (Shorewood, Wisconsin), listed as a Milwaukee County Historical Society landmark